The Ivory Hunters (subtitled Double Barrelled Piano) is an album by jazz pianists Bill Evans and Bob Brookmeyer, originally released on the United Artists label, featuring Evans and Brookmeyer with Percy Heath, and Connie Kay, recorded in 1959.

Brookmeyer was known primarily as a trombonist who occasionally doubled on piano; this was his only album playing piano exclusively.

Reception
The Allmusic review by Michael G. Nastos states: "Pairing a rising superstar of modern jazz with a gentleman known for playing valve trombone and arranging charts might have been deemed by some as a daunting task. Fortunately for the keyboardists, this was a good idea and a marvelous concept, where the two could use the concept of counterpoint and improvisation to an enjoyable means, much like a great chess match. For the listener, you are easily able to hear the difference between ostensible leader Evans in the right channel of the stereo separation, and the accompanist Brookmeyer in the left... Some have called this an effort based more on gimmick and showmanship, but if you agree to listen closely, the depth and substance of Evans and Brookmeyer reveals a lot of soul, invention, and musicians simply having a real good time".

Track listing
 "Honeysuckle Rose"  (Andy Razaf, Fats Waller) - 5:55
 "As Time Goes By" (Herman Hupfeld) - 6:58
 "The Way You Look Tonight" (Dorothy Fields, Jerome Kern) - 7:41
 "It Could Happen to You" (Johnny Burke, Jimmy Van Heusen) - 7:28
 "The Man I Love" (Ira Gershwin, George Gershwin) - 5:58
 "I Got Rhythm" (Gershwin, Gershwin) - 8:34
Recorded in New York City on March 12, 1959

Personnel
Bill Evans - piano
Bob Brookmeyer - piano
Percy Heath - bass
Connie Kay - drums

References

1959 albums
United Artists Records albums
Bill Evans albums
Bob Brookmeyer albums